Town Hall of Mangalore, inaugurated on 29 December 1964 is a Town Hall situated in Hampankatta locality of Mangalore, Karnataka which is a prominent platform for all major social, political and cultural events in the city.

Overview 
Yakshagana, Tulu, Kannada, Konkani Dramas are staged in Town Hall. Especially most of the Tulu Drama's maiden show is played here before the teams start their tours.

It was renovated in November 2016 at a cost of Rs 4.58 crore  and was inaugurated on Children Day

References 

Buildings and structures in Mangalore